Bruno Nestor Azerot (born 22 July 1961 in La Trinité, Martinique) is a French politician served as a member of the French National Assembly from 20 June 2012 to 23 April 2018, representing Martinique's 2nd constituency.

References

French people of Martiniquais descent
Martiniquais politicians
1961 births
Living people
Black French politicians
Deputies of the 15th National Assembly of the French Fifth Republic